Mobile journalism is an emerging form of new media storytelling where reporters use portable electronic devices with network connectivity to gather, edit and distribute news from his or her community.

Such reporters, sometimes known as  mojos (for mobile journalist), are staff or freelance journalists who may use digital cameras and camcorders, laptop PCs, smartphones or tablet devices.  A broadband wireless connection or cellular phone network is then used to transmit the story and imagery for publication.
The term mojo has been in use since 2005, originating at the Fort Myers News-Press and then gaining popularity throughout the Gannett newspaper chain in the United States.

Some key benefits of mobile journalism in comparison to conventional methods include affordability, portability, discretion, approachability, and the ease of access for beginners.

History 

One of the first instance of mobile journalism recorded is from wearable technology pioneer Steve Mann as a feature in a personal visual assistant that he designed, he identified himself as a roving reporter. 

In the beginning, he faced concerns from the press about privacy. He responded by writing on The Tech of MIT on July 24, 1996 a guest column "Wearcam Helps Address Privacy Issue". In the column, he stated that he was wearing his experimental eye glass to bring awareness to the huge and growing number of surveillance cameras that were watching over citizen's activities. He also stated in the article that he "exercises deference to others, " many of the photos he took were "architecture details, experiments in light and shade, posed shots done at the request of those in the picture".

Every year, hundreds of mobile journalists attend mobile journalism conferences. One of these is MojoFest, which has been organized in association with RTE, the national public services broadcaster of Ireland.

Editors at AJ+, a digital outlet form Al Jazeera, use mobile journalists in their video news coverage.

See also
Backpack journalism
Mobile reporting

References

External links

Journalism occupations
Online journalism
Types of journalism